La'Porsha Renae Mays (born July 28, 1993), known professionally as La'Porsha Renae, is an American singer-songwriter from McComb, Mississippi. In 2015, she auditioned for the fifteenth season of American Idol, which at that time was the final season. On April 7, 2016, she finished as runner-up on the show, behind winner Trent Harmon.

In March 2017, Renae released her debut album Already All Ready.

Biography

Early life

La' Porsha Renae Mays was born on July 28, 1993,  in McComb, Mississippi. At age 16, Renae auditioned for the tenth season of American Idol. After graduating from college at age 22, Renae was a victim of domestic abuse. After a year, she separated from her husband and moved back to McComb with her one-month-old daughter Nayalee Keya.

American Idol
Accompanied by her daughter, she returned to audition for American Idol in Little Rock, Arkansas and earned her golden ticket by performing in front of the judges with Radiohead's "Creep". Renae was announced as the final runner-up on April 7, 2016.

Performances

Post Idol

Career beginnings
Hours after the end of the American Idol, Renae announced that she had been signed to Big Machine and Motown Records. American Idol mentor and Big Machine Label Group CEO, Scott Borchetta told Billboard the reason for the signing is "Because of the overwhelming fan demand and success of the farewell season of American Idol,." Ethiopia Habtemariam, president of MoTown Records will oversee Renae's album. In a post-Idol interview about her plans Renae indicated she would be leaving Mississippi, and when asked about the Religious Liberty Accommodations Act, an anti-LGBT law in her home state she said "I am one of the people who don't really agree with that lifestyle. I wasn't brought up that way." Renae's single "Battles" debuted at number 22 on the US R&B singles chart with a first week sales total of 7,000.Renae's first live performance post Idol was on Live with Kelly and Michael promoting  "Battles" which reached its peak at #22 on US R&B Digital Charts.

In August 2016, a remix for "Battles" was released, called the Gold Medal Mix. It became the official song for the United States Women's Gymnastic Team for the 2016 Summer Olympics. In November, Renae released the lead single to her upcoming debut album, entitled "Good Woman."

Career

2017: Already All Ready
Her debut studio album, Already All Ready was released on March 31, 2017. "Good Woman" is the debut single from the album.

Discography

Studio albums

Singles

References

External links
 La'Porsha Renae on American Idol
 

1993 births
21st-century American singers
21st-century African-American women singers
American Idol participants
Living people
Singer-songwriters from Mississippi
People from McComb, Mississippi
American contemporary R&B singers
21st-century American women singers
African-American songwriters